This article lists the confirmed squads lists for badminton's 2012 Thomas & Uber Cup between May 20 and May 27, 2012.

Thomas Cup

Group A

China

Indonesia

England

Uber Cup

Group A

China

Indonesia

South Africa

Teams with Thomas and Uber Cup squads

Men
Peter Gade
Jan O Jorgensen
Viktor Axelsen
Hans-Kristian Vittinghus
Mathias Boe
Carsten Mogensen
Jonas Rasmussen
Joachim Fischer Nielsen
Mads Conrad-Petersen
Mads Pieler Kolding

Women
Tine Baun
Karina Jørgensen
Line Kjaersfeldt
Lene Clausen
Christinna Pedersen
Kamilla Rytter Juhl
Line Damkjaer Kruse
Maria Helsbol
Marie Roepke

Men
Marc Zwiebler
Dieter Domke
Lukas Schmidt
Marcel Reuter
Ingo Kindervater
Johannes Schoettler
Michael Fuchs
Oliver Roth
Peter Kaesbauer
Josche Zurwonne

Women
Juliane Schenk
Karin Schnaase
Olga Konon
Fabienne Deprez
Birgit Michels
Johanna Goliszewski
Sandra Marinello
Carola Bott
Carla Nelte
Isabel Herttrich

Men
Sho Sasaki
Kenichi Tago
Takuma Ueda
Riichi Takeshita
Noriyasu Hirata
Hirokatsu Hashimoto
Hiroyuki Endo
Kenichi Hayakawa
Naoki Kawamae
Shoji Sato

Women
Sayaka Sato
Eriko Hirose
Minatsu Mitani
Ai Goto
Mizuki Fujii
Reika Kakiiwa
Mami Naito
Shizuka Matsuo
Misaki Matsutomo
Ayaka Takahashi

Men
Lee Hyun-il
Shon Wan-ho
Lee Dong-keun
Hong Ji-hoon
Jung Jae-sung
Lee Yong-dae
Ko Sung-Hyun
Yoo Yeon-seong
Kim Ki-jung
Kim Sa-rang

Women
Sung Ji-hyun
Bae Youn-joo
Hwang Hye-youn
Kim Soo-jin
Ha Jung-eun
Kim Min-jung
Jung Kyung-eun
Kim Ha-na
Eom Hye-won
Jang Ye-na

Men
Dorian James
Jacob Maliekal
Willem Viljoen
Prakash Vijayanath

Men
Sattawat Pongnairat
Howard Shu
Nicholas Jinadasa
Tony Gunawan
Howard Bach
Phillip Chew

Women
Jamie Subandhi
Eva Lee
Paula Lynn Obanana
Iris Wang
Rena Wang

Teams with Thomas Cup squad only

Lee Chong Wei
Daren Liew
Muhammad Hafiz Hashim
Chong Wei Feng
Koo Kien Keat
Tan Boon Heong
Goh V Shem
Lim Khim Wah
Hoon Thien How
Tan Wee Kiong

James Eunson
Michael Fowke
Luke Charlesworth
Kevin Dennerly-Minturn
Oliver Leydon-Davis

Vladimir Ivanov
Ivan Sozonov
Vladimir Malkov
Anatoliy Yartsev
Denis Grachev
Vitaliy Durkin
Alexandr Nikolaenko
Evgeniy Dremin
Sergey Lunev

Teams with Uber Cup squad only

Victoria Na
Renuga Veeran
Tara Pilven
Wendy Chen Hsuan-yu
Leanne Choo
Tang Hetian
Eugenia Tanaka
Jacqueline Guan
Gronya Somerville

Tai Tzu-ying
Pai Hsiao-ma
Hung Shih-han
Cheng Wen-hsing
Chien Yu-chin
Wang Pei-rong
Hsieh Pei-chen
Tsai Pei-ling
Chiang Kai-hsin

Yao Jie
Judith Meulendijks
Patty Stolzenbach
Josephine Wentholt
Selena Piek
Iris Tabeling
Eefje Muskens
Samantha Barning
Ilse Vaessen
Paulien van Dooremalen

Ratchanok Inthanon
Porntip Buranaprasertsuk
Sapsiree Taerattanachai
Nichaon Jindapon
Kunchala Voravichitchaikul
Duanganong Aroonkesorn
Saralee Thoungthongkam
Savitree Amitrapai

References
http://tournamentsoftware.com/sport/tournament.aspx?id=18EE3904-EED4-4A97-BF4B-69500CD7021D

Squads